Chintapenta Satyanarayana Rao (20 December 1935 – 14 April 2020) was an Indian writer, actor, director and producer.

Filmography

Feature films
 Oorummadi Bathukulu 
 Kamalamma Kamatam
 Pranam Khareedu
 Kukka kaatuku Cheppu Debba
 Taram Maarindi
 Nayakudu Vinayakudu
 Malle Moggalu
 Yagnam
 Deeksha
 Sommokadidi Sokokadidi (acted)
 Sarada Ramudu (acted)
 Matti Manushulu (acted)

Commissioned programmes
 Ye Gooti Chilaka Aa Gooti Paluku (single episode commissioned program)
 Rajasekhara Charitra
 Bhartruhari Janma Vriththantam
 Raaji Bujji
 Jaataka Kathalu
 Vikramarka Vijayam (dialogues only)
 Kalapoornoday (Hindi Serial for National Network)
 Temples in AP (Hindi Serial for National Network)
 Karpoora Vasantha Raayalu
 Music and Dance in AP (50 Years of Independence Series)
 Vishnu Sharma English Chaduvu (Hyderabad Doordarshan Production)

Sponsored serials
 Meeru Aalochinchandi
 Sikhara Darsanam (single episode)
 Mitra Laabham
 Varudu Kaavali (13 episodes)
 Damit Katha Addam Tirigindi
 Dristi
 Ganapathi
 Vidya
 Mallee Telavaarindi (given only screenplay)

TV plays
 Credit Card
 Teerpu (a play on 20 point formula)
 Kamamma Mogudu
 Oorummadi Bathukulu
 Kallu Terandraa
 Perfect Wife
 Radha Maadhaveeyam
 Cell Gola
 Love Paathaalu
 Koththa Dampathulu
 Meerela Ante Alaage
 Punya Bhumi (dialogues only)

Stage plays
 Malli Eppudostharu 
 Vishnusharma English Chaduvu 
 Aadhunika Telugu Sahithyamlo Hasyam

References

External links
 hyderabadbest.com
 avkf.org
 thehansindia.info

Male actors from Andhra Pradesh
1935 births
2020 deaths
People from East Godavari district
Indian male film actors
20th-century Indian male actors
20th-century Indian dramatists and playwrights
Screenwriters from Andhra Pradesh
Male actors in Telugu cinema